The William Carlos Williams House is located in Rutherford, Bergen County, New Jersey, United States. The building was built in 1913 and was the home to poet and physician William Carlos Williams for 50 years. The home was added to the National Register of Historic Places on June 4, 1973. The building is still used as a private residence and doctor's office.

See also

 National Register of Historic Places listings in Bergen County, New Jersey

References

Houses completed in 1913
Houses on the National Register of Historic Places in New Jersey
Houses in Bergen County, New Jersey
National Register of Historic Places in Bergen County, New Jersey
Rutherford, New Jersey
1913 establishments in New Jersey
New Jersey Register of Historic Places